David Lalty Willis (July 1881 – 26 May 1949) was an English professional footballer who played as a wing half in the Football League for Newcastle United and Sunderland.

Personal life 
Willis served as a private in the Royal Army Service Corps during the First World War.

Honours 
Newcastle United

 Football League First Division: 1908–09
 FA Cup: 1909–10
 FA Charity Shield: 1909

Career statistics

References

1881 births
1949 deaths
English footballers
Association football wing halves
Sunderland A.F.C. players
Newcastle United F.C. players
Reading F.C. players
English Football League players
Southern Football League players
British Army personnel of World War I
Royal Army Service Corps soldiers
FA Cup Final players
Footballers from Newcastle upon Tyne